Uladzimir Shuneyka (born 22 April 1974) is a retired Belarusian footballer. His latest club was Dnepr Mogilev, where he stayed as an assistant coach after retirement.

He played in the first ever Belarusian Premier League season in 1992.

He left for Russian side Krylia Sovetov Samara in 2000. In March 2003, he left for Bulgarian side Levski Sofia, becoming the first (and so far only) Belarusian to play in the A PFG.

Honours
Dnepr-Transmash Mogilev
Belarusian Premier League champion: 1998

International goal

References

External links

1974 births
Living people
Belarusian footballers
Belarusian expatriate footballers
Belarus international footballers
PFC Krylia Sovetov Samara players
PFC Levski Sofia players
FC Spartak Vladikavkaz players
FC Oryol players
Expatriate footballers in Bulgaria
Expatriate footballers in Russia
Association football central defenders
FC Dnepr Mogilev players
Russian Premier League players
First Professional Football League (Bulgaria) players
FC Starye Dorogi players